Physocephala nigra is a species of fly from the genus Physocephala in the family Conopidae. Their larvae are endoparasites of bumble bees of the genus Bombus.

References 

Parasitic flies
Parasites of bees
Conopidae
Insects described in 1776
Muscomorph flies of Europe
Endoparasites
Taxa named by Charles De Geer